St Augustine Academy is a coeducational secondary school with academy status, located in Maidstone, Kent. It is currently rated by Ofsted as 'Good' and is the only Church of England secondary school in the area.

The school was formerly named Astor of Hever School. The principal is Jason Feldwick, who succeeded Peter Midwinter in 2013. The academy moved into its new premises, located adjacent to its existing premises in the Oakwood Park complex, on completion of the first phase of a major building programme in April 2014, with the final phase completed in October 2014. The Academy's 2012/13 results place it in the top 10% of schools nationally with regard to student progress.

External links
Department for Education EduBase - St Augustine Academy

References

Academies in Kent
Secondary schools in Kent
Schools in Maidstone